Otuzikilər (also, Otuzikilyar) is a village and municipality in the Barda Rayon of Azerbaijan.  It has a population of 2,280.

References

Populated places in Barda District